Sporting Marnaval Club is a French association football club founded in 1940. They are based in the town of Marnaval, located in the commune of Saint-Dizier in the Haute-Marne department and are currently playing in the Championnat de France Amateurs 2 Group B, the fifth tier of the French football league system. They play at the Stade des Aciéries in Saint-Dizier.

External links
 Official Site
Profile on soccertoday

Association football clubs established in 1940
1940 establishments in France
Sport in Haute-Marne
Football clubs in Grand Est